Tile Wood is a  nature reserve in Thundersley in Essex. It is managed by the Essex Wildlife Trust.

The wood is ancient, having been mentioned in the Anglo-Saxon period. The main trees are sessile oak, hornbeam and sweet chestnut. Ground flora include wood sorrel, bluebells and wood-rush.

There is access from St Michael's Road, and the site is adjacent to two other nature reserves managed by the Essex Wildlife Trust, Little Haven and Pound Wood.

References

Essex Wildlife Trust